Chanbar Gharbal (also Romanized as Chanbar Gharbāl; also known as Chanbar Qarbāl, Chahar Bāgh, Chanar Gharbāl, and Kalāteh-ye Chanbar Gharbāl) is a village in Dughayi Rural District, in the Central District of Quchan County, Razavi Khorasan Province, Iran. At the 2006 census, its population was 375, in 77 families.

References 

Populated places in Quchan County